Róbert Byssz (2 November 1893 – 8 July 1961) was a Hungarian painter. His work was part of the painting event in the art competition at the 1932 Summer Olympics.

References

1893 births
1961 deaths
20th-century Hungarian painters
Hungarian painters
Olympic competitors in art competitions
People from Nógrád County
Hungarian male painters
20th-century Hungarian male artists